Svein Inge Haagenrud (born 8 November 1971) is a retired Norwegian football goalkeeper and later manager.

He played youth football for Sørumsand IF and is the son of Svein Haagenrud. He was a part of Lillestrøm's senior squad in 1990, and made his debut when Frode Grodås was sent off for punching an opponent, and during the subsequent suspension of Grodås. He did not play first-team football in 1991, so in 1992 he went back to Sørumsand, and in 1993 Nardo FK. Playing the 1995 and 1996 seasons for Kongsvinger, he got 10 league games and 1 cup game. In 1997 he went to Skjetten which also played under the Romerike Fotball moniker, until joining HamKam in 2001. He last featured for HamKam in 2007.

In the summer of 2008 he became head coach of Løten, signing for Elverum in 2009. This was a part-time job, and from early 2009 Haagenrud was also sports coordinator in HamKam. He was also assistant coach under Vegard Skogheim, advancing to head coach for a period in 2014.

References

1971 births
Living people
Norwegian footballers
People from Sørum
Lillestrøm SK players
Nardo FK players
Kongsvinger IL Toppfotball players
Skjetten SK players
Hamarkameratene players
Eliteserien players
Norwegian First Division players
Association football goalkeepers
Norwegian football managers
Hamarkameratene non-playing staff
Hamarkameratene managers
Sportspeople from Viken (county)